Phipps Bridge tram stop is a stop on the Tramlink service in the London Borough of Merton. The stop is named after Phipps Bridge Road, an adjacent residential street.

The tram stop consists of a single island platform. Immediately to the west of the station is a single-track section which reaches as far as Morden Road tram stop. To the east, double track continues to the nearby Belgrave Walk tram stop, which is clearly visible from Phipps Bridge tram stop.

Access to the platform is via pedestrian level crossings over the tracks. To the north a footpath gives access to Phipps Bridge Road. To the south, a gateway gives pedestrian access to the National Trust's Morden Hall Park, which borders the line to the south for a considerable distance each side of the stop.

Connections
London Buses route 200 serves the tram stop.

References

Tramlink stops in the London Borough of Merton
Railway stations in Great Britain opened in 2000